Ickleford is a large village situated on the northern outskirts of Hitchin in North Hertfordshire in England.  It lies on the west bank of the River Hiz and to the east of the main A600 road. The population at the time of the 2011 census was 1,833.

Etymology
Its name is derived from it being a ford, that is a way to cross a river, along the Icknield Way. Thus Ick + Ford. Another village, Ickford, shares the same etymology.

Governance
The modern parish of Ickleford includes areas that were historically detached parts of Shillington and Holwell, both of which were in Bedfordshire. The Shillington exclave was transferred to Hertfordshire by the Counties (Detached Parts) Act 1844. The Holwell exclave was transferred to Hertfordshire in 1897.

Ickleford Parish Council was established under the Local Government Act 1894.

Notable buildings
St Katharine's church, set amid cedar trees, has a 12th-century Norman nave and blocked north doorway with beautifully carved zigzag arches, and a south aisle and chapel added by Sir Giles Gilbert Scott in 1859. The east window has some fine stained glass of 1860. It is the burial-place of Henry Boswell, "King of the Gypsies", who died in 1760, at the advanced age of 90; the remains of his wife and granddaughter are likewise interred here.

Transport
The Icknield Way Path passes through the village on its 110-mile journey from Ivinghoe Beacon in Buckinghamshire to Knettishall Heath in Suffolk. The Icknield Way Trail, a multi-user route for walkers, horse riders and off-road cyclists also passes through the village. The Bedford to Hitchin Line used to pass through the village, remnants of which can still be seen in places such as Gerry's Hole where parts of the old bridge and embankment are still present. The local Parish Council attempted to raise public awareness of the village through its Parish Plan in 2006–07.

Facilities
Ickleford has a primary school (Ickleford Primary School), village hall, general store and a unisex hairdresser

There are three public houses: The Plume of Feathers, The Old George and The Cricketers.

The large Sports and Recreation ground also contains a playground and a licensed bar. The Sports and Recreation Ground caters for several sports, including cricket, football, squash and pétanque, and is home to the Ickleford Cricket Club, whose symbol represents two crossed farmers pitchforks. The club was founded in 1947 and in 2006 won promotion to Division 3 of the Saracens Herts League, and was promoted to Division 2 in 2010. Since 2006, the cricket club's first team has used the nickname "The Tigers". There is also an equestrian centre with a Pony Club . Outside the Recreation Ground towards the school there is a newly built cemetery.

Ickleford also has a Scout troop (the 1st Ickleford (9th Hitchin)) with active sections of Beavers, Cubs and Scouts for both boys and girls.

References

External links

Ickleford Cricket Club
Ickleford Parish Council
Ickleford Primary School

Villages in Hertfordshire
Areas of Hitchin
Civil parishes in Hertfordshire